Mulsanne is a commune in the Sarthe department in the region of Pays de la Loire in north-western France.

Population

Motor racing

The Circuit de la Sarthe, which is used in the sports car endurance race 24 Hours of Le Mans, features the long straight Ligne Droite des Hunaudières leading to Mulsanne, making a tight right hand turn before the entrance of the village itself. The famous straight is often called the Mulsanne Straight in English.

See also
Communes of the Sarthe department

References

External links

 www.mulsanne.fr 

Communes of Sarthe